Sara N. Love (born April 6, 1967) is an American politician who represents the 16th legislative district in the Maryland House of Delegates.

Early life and career
Love was born in Evanston, Illinois on April 6, 1967, where she attended New Trier High School in neighboring Winnetka. She attended Princeton University in Princeton, New Jersey, where she earned a Bachelor of Arts degree in history in 1989, and Northwestern University Pritzker School of Law in Chicago, where she earned a Juris Doctor in law in 1993. After graduating, she worked as a law clerk for judge Timothy K. Lewis from 1993 to 1994. From 1998 to 2014, she worked for various women's health groups, including the Feminist Majority Foundation, the National Women's Health Foundation, and NARAL Pro-Choice America. From 2005 to 2016, Love worked for the American Civil Liberties Union of Maryland, serving as the president of the board of directors from 2008 to 2012 and as the group's public policy director from 2012 to 2016.

In August 2017, Love declared her candidacy for state delegate in Maryland's 16th legislative district, seeking to succeed state delegate William Frick, who was running for Maryland's 6th congressional district that year. In the primary election, Love finished third in a field of eight candidates, edging out Montgomery Blair High School teacher Samir Paul by 9 votes. Paul filed for a recount of the results on July 10, 2018. Love maintained her lead over Paul after the recount, increasing her vote total in the district to 12 votes. He conceded from the election on July 27, 2018. She came in third place in the general election, receiving 29.4 percent of the vote.

During the 2020 United States presidential election, Love canvassed for Joe Biden in the Pennsylvania cities of York and Harrisburg.

In the legislature
Love was sworn into the Maryland House of Delegates on January 9, 2019.

Committee assignments
  Environment and Transportation Committee, 2019–present (local government & bi-county agencies subcommittee, 2019; natural resources, agriculture & open space subcommittee, 2019; land use & ethics subcommittee, 2020–present; motor vehicle & transportation subcommittee, 2020–present)

Other memberships
 Maryland Legislative Latino Caucus, 2019–present
 Maryland Legislative Transit Caucus, 2019–present
 Women Legislators of Maryland, 2019–present

Political positions
Love is a self-described progressive Democrat.

Environment
Love introduced legislation in the 2019 session that would strengthen and codify the Keep Antibiotics Effective Act, which restricts the use of antibiotics in food-producing animals. The bill passed and became law without Governor Larry Hogan's signature.

In 2021, the Maryland League of Conservation Voters gave Love a perfect score in their annual environmental scorecard.

Minimum wage
Love supports legislating for a $15 minimum wage. During the 2019 session, she co-sponsored and voted in favor of House Bill 166, which would gradually raise the state's minimum wage to $15 an hour by 2025.

Policing
During her time at the ACLU, Love helped garner bipartisan support in the General Assembly for bills that later became law, such as one that prevented police from searching a person's emails before obtaining a warrant and another that prevents police from tracking cellphones without warrants. She also promoted legislation that would limit civil asset forfeiture abuse by requiring conviction before police could confiscate property.

Social issues
Love introduced legislation in the 2019 session that would allow Maryland drivers to designate their gender as "X" on their license. The bill passed and became law without Governor Larry Hogan's signature.

Electoral history

References

External links 
 

1967 births
21st-century American women politicians
21st-century American politicians
Living people
People from Evanston, Illinois
Harvard University alumni
Northwestern University alumni
Maryland lawyers
Democratic Party members of the Maryland House of Delegates
Women state legislators in Maryland